Pyrops delessertii is a species of true bug in the family Fulgoridae, in the genus Pyrops which are sometimes called "lanternflies". This species is found in the Nilgiris and Western Ghats of southern India. The head and "snout" is greenish or brownish. The thorax has a reddish colour and there are three spots on the mesonotum.

The hindwings are bluish green with a broad black border along the margin. The species is found in the Western Ghats and the Nilgiris. Adolphe Delessert who discovered the species in the Nilgiris noted that it tended to be found along riverine forests and that it was hard to capture. It differs slightly in pattern and length of the "snout" from Pyrops maculatus and is sometimes treated as a subspecies of P. maculatus.

References

External links
 FLOW database

delessertii
Insects of India
Insects described in 1840